Barathrum: V.I.T.R.I.O.L. is the debut album of American black metal band Absu. It was released on December 1, 1993 via Gothic Records, and re-released in 1994 by Osmose Productions with three bonus tracks. It would be reissued once more in 2011 by The Crypt Records, as a boxset containing 3 discs — the first disc contains the album itself plus the three live tracks from the Osmose Productions re-issue; the second disc contains alternate versions of the tracks "Descent to Acheron", "An Equinox of Fathomless Disheartenment", "The Thrice Is Greatest to Ninnigal", "Infinite and Profane Thrones" and "Fantasizing to the Third of the Pagan Visions"; and the third disc contains the Temples of Offal EP, the Return of the Ancients demo, and the track "Abhorred Xul", composed when Absu was still called Azathoth.

"Barathrum" is a word in Latin (derived from the Greek βάραθρον — várathron) meaning "gulch", or "deep, dark hole", while "V.I.T.R.I.O.L." is an acronym for "Visita Interiora Terræ Rectificando Invenies Occultum Lapidem", an alchemic motto that can be roughly translated as "Visit the interior of the earth and [by] purifying [yourself] you will find the hidden stone".

Track listing

Credits
Recorded album
Shaftiel – guitars, vocals
David Athron Mystica – guitar
Black Massith – keyboards, synthesizers
Equitant – bass and effects
Proscriptor – drums, percussion, vocals and lyrics
Lynette Mitchell – additional backing vocals on "Descent to Acheron"

Bonus live songs
Proscriptor – drums, vocals
Shaftiel – guitars, vocals
Equitant – guitars
Mezzadurus (Bloodstorm) – lead vocals, bass

Production
Arranged & produced by Absu
Engineered & mixed by Danny Brown & Brian McCurry
Mastered by Danny Brown

References

Absu (band) albums
1993 debut albums